Megachile atripes is a species of bee in the family Megachilidae. It was described by Heinrich Friese in 1904.

References

Atripes
Insects described in 1904